"Do Nothing till You Hear from Me" is a 1944 song with music by Duke Ellington and lyrics by Bob Russell.

Do Nothing till You Hear from Me or Do Nothing 'til You Hear from Me may also refer to:

 Do Nothing 'til You Hear from Me (album), a 1963 album by Johnny Griffin
 Do Nothing till You Hear from Me (radio program), aired in 2004 on BBC Radio 4
 Do Nothing till You Hear from Me (album), a 2016 album by The Mute Gods

See also
 Do Nothing (disambiguation)